Heraclea or Herakleia (Ἡράκλεια), also transliterated as Heracleia, was a town of ancient Lydia at the foot of Mount Sipylus. From this town magnets were known as Heracleus lapis.
 
Its site is tentatively located near Emiralem, Asiatic Turkey.

References

Populated places in ancient Lydia
Former populated places in Turkey